Bloom Bloom is the second single album by South Korean boy group The Boyz. It was released on April 29, 2019 through Cre.Ker Entertainment. The single album consists of three tracks.

Background 
The Boyz released their second single album Bloom Bloom and its lead single "Bloom Bloom" on April 29.

On May 7, The group received their first-ever music show win on SBS MTV's The Show by "Bloom Bloom".

Track listing

Charts

Accolades

Release history

References 

2019 singles
Single albums
The Boyz (South Korean band) albums